The Grand Mesa National Forest is a U.S. National Forest in Mesa, Delta and Garfield Counties in Western Colorado.  It borders the White River National Forest to the north and the Gunnison National Forest to the east.  The forest covers most of Grand Mesa and the south part of Battlement Mesa. It has a total area of 346,555 acres (541.49 sq mi, or 1,402.46 km2). It is managed by the United States Forest Service together with Gunnison National Forest and Uncompahgre National Forest from offices in Delta, Colorado. There are local ranger district offices located in Grand Junction.

Animals that inhabit this forest are elk, mule deer, Canadian lynx, black bears, pine marten, cougars, and bighorn sheep. Birdwatchers get a seasonal opportunity to view species of bird such bald eagles, boreal owls, golden eagles, Mexican spotted owls, common ravens, wild turkeys and peregrine falcons. 

Originally called Battlement Mesa Forest Reserve, created by Benjamin Harrison on December 24, 1892, it was the third forest reserve created in United States. It is the largest flat top mountain in the world.

See also 
 List of U.S. National Forests
 Grand Mesa Scenic and Historic Byway, a Forest Service Byway

References

External links 

Grand Mesa, Uncompahgre and Gunnison National Forests (USDA Forest Service)

 
Protected areas of Delta County, Colorado
Protected areas of Garfield County, Colorado
Protected areas of Mesa County, Colorado
National Forests of Colorado
Protected areas established in 1892
1892 establishments in Colorado